The Pitchfork Music Festival 2012 was held on July 13 to 15, 2012 at the Union Park, Chicago, United States. The festival was headlined by Feist, Godspeed You! Black Emperor and Vampire Weekend.

Lineup
Headline performers are listed in boldface. Artists listed from latest to earliest set times.

References

External links

Pitchfork Music Festival
2012 music festivals